Kovvur railway station (station code:KVR), is located in the Indian state of Andhra Pradesh, which serves the town of Kovvur in West Godavari district. It is located on Howrah–Chennai main line and falls in the Vijayawada railway division of the South Central Railway.

Classification 
In terms of earnings and outward passengers handled, Kovvur is categorized as a Non-Suburban Grade-5 (NSG-5) railway station. Based on the re–categorization of Indian Railway stations for the period of 2017–18 and 2022–23, an NSG–5 category station earns between – crore and handles  passengers.

Station amenities 

It is one of the 38 stations in the division to be equipped with Automatic Ticket Vending Machines (ATVMs).

References 

Railway stations in West Godavari district
Vijayawada railway division